Galbi may refer to
Short ribs in Korean
Galbi, grilled short ribs in Korean cuisine
Galbijjim, braised short ribs
Galbitang, short ribs soup
Dak galbi, stir-fried hot and spicy chicken dish
Galbi (song), a Hebrew poem
Fakhreddine Galbi, a Tunisian soccer player